St. John's Hospital, founded in 1875 by the Hospital Sisters of St. Francis, has 457 licensed beds and is a primary teaching hospital for the Southern Illinois University School of Medicine (SIU).

Located in Springfield, Illinois, St. John's is a member of the Hospital Sisters Health System (HSHS), a Roman Catholic healthcare mission founded to continue the healing ministry of Jesus Christ. It is sponsored by the Hospital Sisters of St. Francis.

St. John's is one of two Level One Emergency Trauma Centers a distinction it shares with Memorial Medical Center (MMC) (Springfield, Illinois) and only Level 2 Pediatric Trauma Center for the Springfield area. St. John's is the home to the Prairie Heart Institute and AthletiCare.

References

Hospitals in Illinois
Teaching hospitals in Illinois
Buildings and structures in Springfield, Illinois
Buildings and structures on U.S. Route 66
Franciscan hospitals
Hospitals established in 1875
Catholic hospitals in North America